Raymond Walter Wietecha  (November 2, 1928 – December 14, 2002) was an American football center in the National Football League for the New York Giants. He played college football at Northwestern University and Michigan State University.

Following his retirement, Wietecha entered coaching and was the offensive coordinator under Vince Lombardi in Green Bay when the Packers won Super Bowl I and Super Bowl II.

1963-1964 Los Angeles Rams (OL)
1965-1970 Green Bay Packers (OC)
1972-1976 New York Giants (OL)

In 2012, the Professional  Football Researchers Association named Wietecha to the PRFA Hall of Very Good Class of 2012

USFL
Wietecha was an assistant coach in the USFL for the Chicago Blitz and the Arizona Wranglers.

References

1928 births
2002 deaths
American football offensive linemen
Northwestern Wildcats football players
New York Giants players
Eastern Conference Pro Bowl players
Green Bay Packers coaches
Michigan State Spartans football players
Sportspeople from East Chicago, Indiana
Players of American football from Chicago
Players of American football from Indiana
American people of Polish descent